The Ghateshwar Temple - also known as Ghateshwara Mahadeva temple - in Badoli (or Baroli) is one of the nine temples near the river Chambal in Rajasthan, India. The Ghateshwar temple is dedicated to the god Shiva and is constructed in the Pratihara style of circa. It is located in Rawatbhata, which is around 50 km from Kota. The Ghateshwar temple is governed by the Archaeological Survey of India.

Architecture 
Believed to have been built in the tenth century, the massive structure consists of a pancharatha sanctum, antarala and mukha mandapa, which rest on six pillars. The entrance is through a makara-torana. There are surasundaris which are carved on the front pillars of mukha mandapa in dance postures.

See also 

 Baroli Temples

References 

Hindu temples in Rajasthan
Buildings and structures in Chittorgarh district